Elvange is a small town in the commune of Schengen, in south-eastern Luxembourg.  , the town has a population of 644.

Towns in Luxembourg
Remich (canton)